107 Piscium  is a single star in the constellation of Pisces. 107 Piscium is the star's Flamsteed designation. John Flamsteed numbered the stars of Pisces from 1 to 113, publishing his Catalogus Britannicus in 1725. He accidentally numbered 107 Piscium twice, as he also allocated it the designation of 2 Arietis. This star is faintly visible to the naked eye with an apparent visual magnitude that has been measured varying between 5.14 and 5.26. However, that finding of variation was not confirmed by subsequent observations and is most likely spurious data.

This object is a K-type main-sequence star with a stellar classification of K1V, indicating it is generating energy from core hydrogen fusion. It is somewhat older than the Sun—approximately 6 billion years old. The star has 86% of the mass and 82% of the radius of the Sun, but shines with only 46% of the Sun's luminosity. The abundance of elements other than hydrogen and helium—the star's metallicity—is slightly lower than that of the Sun. The level of chromospheric activity is similar to the Sun, and it shows a simple cycle of variation.

107 Piscium has been examined for the presence of an infrared excess caused by exozodiacal dust, but none was detected. The habitable zone for this star, defined as the locations where liquid water could be present on an Earth-like planet, is at a radius of 0.52– (AU), where  is the average distance from the Earth to the Sun.

However, this result has not been not confirmed.

See also
 107 Piscium in fiction

References

External links
 SolStation article on 107 Piscium.

K-type main-sequence stars
Piscium, 107
Astrometric binaries

Pisces (constellation)
Durchmusterung objects
Piscium, 107
0068
010476
007981
0493